About Love is a 2015 Russian romantic comedy. It was written by Anna Melikyan and Andrey Migachev directed by Melikyan. It won the Main Prize and the Prize of Film Distributors Jury at the Kinotavr film festival. It also was awarded at the Golden Eagle Awards as the Best Feature Film. A sequel was released in 2017.

Plot 
The audience gathered at the "Strelka" to listen to the open lecture "About love". The female lecturer combines scientific interpretations of the biological essence of the organism's processes with high feelings about which poems and music are written. The lecture is accompanied by experiments and experiments, which participants become participants themselves. In parallel, there are branches to a series of short stories, somehow connected with love.

A police raid in the club, where members of the anime movement gather for free communication. Among the detainees are Himea and Taito, who are six months in a relationship, but have never seen each other without images. Real names (Lena Grachyova and Igor Petrov) give rise to young people to meet in the traditional sense, but this undertaking is failing. Relationships are established only after the return of young lovers in bright anime-images. A single police officer took advantage of the recommendation for a suitable image, which won recognition marks already at the first visit to the club.

A large businessman collects employees in order to announce a crisis in the economy and dismiss the entire team. Office manager Liza is in limbo, because now there was nobody to make coffee. However, the outstanding virtues of Lisa do not give rest to her leader and he openly offers the girl full content in exchange for satisfying his male desires. Liza is overwhelmed by doubts about the proposal that has been received and there are no rest in the relationship with her boyfriend Grisha, who is unemployed for the third month and practically does not break away from computer tans. Liza decides to accept the offer of the businessman, and in the evening of the same day he hears the offer of the hand and heart from his Grisha.

Representatives of different nations come to Moscow for the festival of Russian culture. Among the participants of the festival is a Japanese named Miyako. Among its main purposes is the search for a Russian husband. To do this, she appoints through a dating site a series of visits, each of the candidates associating with musical notes. The man who gave Miyako a matryoshka, who turns out to be an ordinary  collector  of sex with foreigners who has a wife and children, receives a choice and an invitation to his hotel room. In frustrated feelings, Miyako knocks at the door of a neighboring room, where another festival participant lives - a Japanese guy from her home town. He is the only one with whom you can discuss the Russian soul and Russian culture. After talking all night and performing the song "Gop-Stop" for the fidelity to the guitar, they find each other.

Boris - a public figure who advocates the demolition of monuments that disfigure the face of the city. Therefore, after each hobby on the next gray wall appears image of his chosen one. For the image of a new picture, his wife finds him, who followed him through the Instagram. Under the cover of the night, she tries to destroy the drawing and runs into her rival, whose image has just been destroyed. Girls get acquainted, spend a bright night in the city, after which they return home together, where their beloved artist sleeps. Sounds like a proposal to live together.

The heroine of the final story is the lecturer herself of the course about love, which through the dating site appoints a sexual meeting with a stranger, who turns out to be her former, and now wealthy man, who made a proposal to his young lady the day before. At the same time he has a persistent unwillingness to marry and to his ex, he applies for a paid consultation. As a result of the analysis it turns out that the young girl in the course put all the available arsenal of privorotov and even made a doll of voodoo. On requests to remove the love spell of the lecturer refuses and, taking the promised fee, leaves. On the street he meets artist Boris, for whom, apparently, becomes a new object of inspiration.

Cast

References

External links

 Алхимия любви. Параллельные миры в вышедшем на экраны фильме-трактате Анны Меликян

2015 films
2010s Russian-language films
Films directed by Anna Melikian
2015 romantic comedy-drama films
Russian romantic comedy-drama films
Russian anthology films
2015 comedy films
2015 drama films